Seeadler may refer to:

Vessels 
 DFS Seeadler, German flying boat sailplane
 , patrol vessel of the Papua New Guinean Maritime Component
 , German cruiser
 , German merchant raider

Other uses
Seeadler Harbor, a harbor on Manus Island, Papua New Guinea

See also
Seeadler-class fast attack craft